Hilton College is a South African private boarding school for boys located near the town of Hilton in the KwaZulu-Natal Midlands. It was founded in 1872 by Gould Arthur Lucas and Reverend William Orde Newnham as a non-denominational Christian boys school.

Sports

International Sportsmen
Note: for international sportsmen all dates refer to year of national selection

Other Sportsmen

Government

South African Justices

Politicians

Armed Forces

Business

Arts & Literature

Other

References 

Alumni of Hilton College (South Africa)